Eñaut Zubikarai Goñi (born 26 February 1984) is a Spanish former professional footballer who played as a goalkeeper, currently goalkeeping coach of New Zealand club Auckland City FC.

Club career

Real Sociedad
Born in Ondarroa, Biscay, Zubikarai joined Real Sociedad in 2003 at age 19, being assigned to the B team in Segunda División B. For the 2005–06 season he was loaned to Basque neighbours SD Eibar, but appeared in only one game after suffering a shoulder injury (he suffered another after having returned to his parent club) and also suffered relegation from Segunda División, which triggered thoughts of an early retirement.

After Asier Riesgo moved to Recreativo de Huelva, Zubikarai was definitely promoted to the main squad but, after the former returned from his loan, both battled for second-choice status during the 2009–10 campaign. The latter contributed 12 matches as the Txuriurdin returned to La Liga after a three-year absence.

Zubikarai made his debut in the top flight on 10 April 2012 at the age of 28, in a 1–1 home draw against Real Betis. He continued to act as understudy to Claudio Bravo for the duration of his spell, but was Real Sociedad's goalkeeper in the Copa del Rey, notably helping to a semi-final run in 2013–14.

After the Chilean's departure to FC Barcelona in summer 2014, Zubikarai became the starter. However, shortly after conceding four goals in an away fixture against Villarreal CF in December, he lost his position to Gerónimo Rulli.

Zubikarai was released by Real Sociedad on 30 June 2015, after the expiration of his contract. On 20 January of the following year, after several months without a club, he signed a five-month deal with C.D. Tondela from Portugal.

Auckland City
In September 2016, free agent Zubikarai joined Auckland City FC. As part of a stellar defence which saw the team only allow 12 goals during the 2017–18 season as they won the New Zealand Football Championship title, he went 1,404 minutes or 15 games without conceding a goal in all competitions, beginning in the 70th minute of a 1–1 home draw against Southern United FC on 13 January 2018 and ending in the 37th minute of a 2–2 draw to Team Wellington on 29 April in the semi-finals of the OFC Champions League. This exploit constituted the third-longest streak of its kind of all time – behind Mazarópi and Thabet El-Batal – as well as the longest of the 21st century, and of any European goalkeeper.

Zubikarai became head goalkeeper coach on 5 October 2020, following the retirement of incumbent Simone Naddi.

Personal life
In the summer of 2011, Hércules CF was on the verge of signing Zubikarai on loan, but pulled out, officially on financial grounds. However, the club reportedly feared public reaction to the signing of a player whose father, Cándido, was affiliated with terrorist organisation ETA, and was sentenced to thirty years in 1989 for the murder of two civil guards.

References

External links

1984 births
Living people
People from Ondarroa
Sportspeople from Biscay
Spanish footballers
Footballers from the Basque Country (autonomous community)
Association football goalkeepers
La Liga players
Segunda División players
Segunda División B players
Real Sociedad B footballers
SD Eibar footballers
Real Sociedad footballers
Primeira Liga players
C.D. Tondela players
New Zealand Football Championship players
Auckland City FC players
Basque Country international footballers
Spanish expatriate footballers
Expatriate footballers in Portugal
Expatriate association footballers in New Zealand
Spanish expatriate sportspeople in Portugal
Spanish expatriate sportspeople in New Zealand